The Last Pedestrian is a 1960 West German comedy film directed by Wilhelm Thiele and starring Heinz Erhardt, Christine Kaufmann and Käthe Haack.It was shot at the Göttingen Studios. The film's set's were designed by the art director Walter Haag.

Cast

References

External links

1960 comedy films
German comedy films
West German films
Films directed by Wilhelm Thiele
Films about vacationing
Films with screenplays by Wilhelm Thiele
1960s English-language films
1960s German films
Films shot at Göttingen Studios